Trichopus zeylanicus is a small herbaceous plant, which is one of only two species of its genus, Trichopus. Formerly it was placed in its own family, Trichopodaceae, but is now included in the family Dioscoreaceae. The shape of the leaves can be highly variable even within one location, but the most common shape is cordate. The herb grows on sandy soil near rivers and streams in shady places in lowland and intermediate altitude forests. It flowers year long and the fruits are thought to be dispersed by water. The unusual flowers are purplish black.

Distribution
T. zeylanicus grows in Malaysia, Singapore, Sri Lanka, Thailand and the Southwestern Ghats mountains of South India.

Traditional medicine

It has been in use for centuries by the Kaani tribal community of the Agastya Koodam ranges in Kerala, India, for its medicinal properties.

Modern Indian scientists learned the medical properties of Trichopus zeylanicus  in December 1987 while on a scientific expedition to the Agasthia Hills in the Western Ghats. They noticed that their guides, belonging to the Kaani tribe, were very energetic in sharp contrast to themselves. They had walked for several hours with the scientists, but the difference was that they ate the fruits of a wild plant T. zeylanicus as they walked. It was found from the Kaani men that it was indeed the fruits they were eating that made them energetic, a fact about the plant well known to the tribe for ages. Historically, the members of the tribes called the plant 'chathan kalanji' literally meaning 'satan destroyer'. The more popular name of the plant, "Arogya pacha" (literally meaning "the green that gives strength") was given to it by the scientists.

Detailed chemical and pharmacological investigations showed that the leaf of the plant contained flavonoid glycosides, glycolipids and some other non-steroidal compounds.  In the article published in www.ijpcbs.com showed the antibacterial and antifungal activities of the leaf extract against 8 bacterial and 8 fungal strains (Manza and Saj, 2013)

Legal issues
The Indian commercial and scientific interest in the herb caused misguided suspicions of bio-piracy in Sri Lanka, where it is called Bimpol, and exports of the herb were forbidden in 1998.

Images

Notes

References
Indian Patent 1996 – A process for preparation of "JEEVANI" a novel immunoenhancing antifatigue antistress and hepatoprotective drug from the plants Trichopus zeylanicus ssp, Travancoricus, Withania somnifera, Piper longum and Evoluvulus alsinoides.
Indian Patent 1996 – A process for preparation of an antidiabetic drug from the plants Trichopus zeylanicus ssp, Travancoricus, Withania somnifera, Piper longum
Pushpangadan P., Rajasekhran S., Ratheesh Kumar P. K., Jawahar C. R., Velayudhan Nair V., Lakshmi N., and Sarad Amma L., 1988, "Arogyapacha (Trichopus Zeylanicus Gaertn.). The Ginseng of Kani Tribes of Agasthyar Hills (Kerala) for Eevergreen Health and Vitality." Ancient Sciences of Life, 7 1988: 13–16.
Pushpangadan P., Rajasekaran S., Latha P. G., Evans D. A. and Valsa Raj R., 1994, "Further Studies on the pharmacology of Trichopus zeylanicus." Ancient Sciences of Life, Vol. 14xiv(3) 1995: 127–135
Subramoniam A., Madhavachandran V., Rajasekharan S., Pushpangadan P., "Aphrodisiac property of Trichopus zeylanicus extract in male mice." Journal of Ethnopharmacology, Vol. 57(1). Issue: June 1997: 21–27.
Subramoniam A., Evans D.A., Valsaraj R., Rajasekharan S., Pushpangadan P., "Inhibition of antigen-induced degranulation of sensitized mast cells by Trichopus zeylanicus in mice and rats." Journal of Ethnopharmacology, Vol. 68(1–3). Issue: 15 December 1999: 137–143.
Susan Chacko.; M.G. Sethuraman.; V. George.; P. Pushpangadan. "Phytochemical constituents of Trichopus zeylanicus ssp. Travancoricus", J. Med. Arom. Plant Sci., 2002, 24, 703–706.
Jayaraman K. S., "Indian Ginseng brings royalties for tribe." Nature, 381, 16 May 1996.
Meenakshi Ganguli, 1998, "Descendants of "God’s Physician" Share Their Secrets." Time. 9 Nov 1998. Reprinted in Japanese-language version, No 38, February, 1999.
"Jeevani: The Anti-Stress/Pro-Energy Botanical Complex", Natural Body building and Fitness. New York, February, 2000.
Antimicrobial properties of Trichopus zeylanicus was proved by Saj and Mansa (2007) University college, Thiruvananthapuram Kerala, {M.Phil thesis, University of Kerala.
12. CYTOTOXIC AND ANTIMICROBIAL STUDIES ON AROGYAPACHA OR KERALA GINSENG LEAF EXTRACTS
MM. Manza and Oommen P Saj Department of Botany, University College, Trivandrum-695003, Kerala, India (www.ijpcbs.com).

Dioscoreaceae
Plants described in 1788
Medicinal plants
Flora of India (region)
Flora of Malaya
Flora of Sri Lanka
Flora of Thailand